Fares E. Sayegh is a Greek orthopaedic surgeon at the G. Papanikolaou General Hospital and a professor at Aristotle University of Thessaloniki, both in Thessaloniki, Greece.
He has an h-index of 18	

His most-cited articles are:

Education
Sayegh has M.D. and Ph.D. degrees from Aristotle University of Thessaloniki.

Distinctions

References

External links

Academic staff of the Aristotle University of Thessaloniki
Greek orthopedic surgeons
Scientists from Thessaloniki
Living people
Year of birth missing (living people)
People in health professions from Thessaloniki